The 2020–21 UEFA Champions League knockout phase began on 16 February with the round of 16 and ended on 29 May 2021 with the final at the Estádio do Dragão in Porto, Portugal, to decide the champions of the 2020–21 UEFA Champions League. A total of 16 teams competed in the knockout phase.

Times are CET/CEST, as listed by UEFA (local times, if different, are in parentheses).

Qualified teams
The knockout phase involves the sixteen teams which qualified as winners and runners-up of each of the eight groups in the group stage.

Format
Each tie in the knockout phase, apart from the final, was played over two legs, with each team playing one leg at home. The team that scored more goals on aggregate over the two legs advanced to the next round. If the aggregate score was level, the away goals rule was applied, i.e. the team that scored more goals away from home over the two legs advanced. If away goals were also equal, then extra time was played. The away goals rule was again applied after extra time, i.e. if there were goals scored during extra time and the aggregate score is still level, the visiting team advanced by virtue of more away goals scored. If no goals were scored during extra time, the winners were decided by a penalty shoot-out. In the final, which was played as a single match, if the score was level at the end of normal time, extra time would be played, followed by a penalty shoot-out if the score was still level.

The mechanism of the draws for each round was as follows:
In the draw for the round of 16, the eight group winners were seeded, and the eight group runners-up were unseeded. The seeded teams were drawn against the unseeded teams, with the seeded teams hosting the second leg. Teams from the same group or the same association could not be drawn against each other.
In the draws for the quarter-finals and semi-finals, there were no seedings, and teams from the same group or the same association could be drawn against each other. As the draws for the quarter-finals and semi-finals were held together before the quarter-finals were played, the identity of the quarter-final winners was not known at the time of the semi-final draw. A draw was also held to determine which semi-final winner was designated as the "home" team for the final (for administrative purposes as it was played at a neutral venue).

For the quarter-finals and semi-finals, teams from the same city were not scheduled to play at home on the same day or on consecutive days, due to logistics and crowd control. To avoid such scheduling conflict, if the two teams were drawn to play at home for the same leg, the order of legs of the tie involving the team with the lower domestic ranking in the qualifying season was reversed from the original draw.

Schedule
The schedule was as follows (all draws were held at the UEFA headquarters in Nyon, Switzerland).

Bracket

Round of 16

The draw for the round of 16 was held on 14 December 2020, 12:00 CET.

Summary

The first legs were played on 16, 17, 23 and 24 February, and the second legs were played on 9, 10, 16 and 17 March 2021.

|}

Matches

Manchester City won 4–0 on aggregate.

Bayern Munich won 6–2 on aggregate.

Chelsea won 3–0 on aggregate.

Liverpool won 4–0 on aggregate.

4–4 on aggregate. Porto won on away goals.

Paris Saint-Germain won 5–2 on aggregate.

Borussia Dortmund won 5–4 on aggregate.

Real Madrid won 4–1 on aggregate.

Quarter-finals

The draw for the quarter-finals was held on 19 March 2021, 12:00 CET.

Summary

The first legs were played on 6 and 7 April, and the second legs were played on 13 and 14 April 2021.

|}

Matches

Manchester City won 4–2 on aggregate.

Chelsea won 2–1 on aggregate.

3–3 on aggregate. Paris Saint-Germain won on away goals.

Real Madrid won 3–1 on aggregate.

Semi-finals

The draw for the semi-finals was held on 19 March 2021, 12:00 CET, after the quarter-final draw.

Summary

The first legs were played on 27 and 28 April, and the second legs were played on 4 and 5 May 2021.

|}

Matches

Manchester City won 4–1 on aggregate.

Chelsea won 3–1 on aggregate.

Final

The final was played on 29 May 2021 at the Estádio do Dragão in Porto. A draw was held on 19 March 2021, after the quarter-final and semi-final draws, to determine the "home" team for administrative purposes.

Notes

References

External links

Knockout Phase
2020-21
February 2021 sports events in Europe
March 2021 sports events in Europe
April 2021 sports events in Europe
May 2021 sports events in Europe